TRT Çocuk is a Turkish television station, part of the Turkish Radio and Television Corporation, which can also be received in Azerbaijan. It broadcasts a wide range of programming for children such as cartoons, drama and entertainment 24 hours a day. Previously, the channel broadcast until 21:00 TRT (Turkish Time), and broadcast TRT Okul until 06:30 from 2011 to 2017.

Shows

Original programming 

 Anka: Anadolu Kartalları
 Barbaros
 Benimle Oynar Mısın?
 Bulmaca Kulesi
 Cille
 Çatlak Yumurtalar
 Dede Korkut Hikayeleri
 Doru
 Emiray
 İbi
 İstanbul Muhafızları
 Karınca Ailesi
 Keloğlan Masalları
 Köstebekgiller
 Küçük Hezarfen
 Maysa ve Bulut
 Nane İle Limon
 Nasreddin Hoca Zaman Yolcusu
 Niloya
 Oyunbaz Sorular
 Ömer Seyfettin Hikayeleri
 Pepee
 Pırdino
 Pırıl
 Rafadan Tayfa
 Tozkoparan
 Yade Yade
 Z Takımı

Other 

 A Miss Mallard Mystery
 Arabian Nights: Sinbad's Adventures
 Arthur
 Bernard
 Charlie and Lola
 Chuggington
 Dinosaur Train
 Dinotrux
 Doki Adventures
 Doug
 Element Hunters
 Erky Perky
 Fishtronaut
 Flipper and Lopaka
 Franny's Feet
 Gerald Mc Boing Boing
 Guess How Much I Love You
 Harry and His Bucket Full of Dinosaurs
 Heidi
 Hutos Mini Mini
 In the Night Garden...
 Jibber Jabber
 Kitou Scrogneugneu
 Laura's Star
 Max & Maestro
 Maya the Bee
 Nelly & Caesar
 Nils Holgersson
 Noonbory and the Super Seven
 Odd Squad
 Sid the Science Kid
 Super Wings
 Tales of Tatonka
 The Adventures of Little Brown Bear
 The Adventures of Paddington Bear
 The Cat in the Hat Knows a Lot About That!
 The Country Mouse and the City Mouse Adventures
 The Magic Roundabout
 The Magic Tree
 The Neverending Story
 The New Adventures of Nanoboy
 The Triplets
 The Wombles
 The Zack Files
 The Zula Patrol
 Uniminipet
 Vic the Viking
 Vicky the Viking
 Vipo: Adventures of the Flying Dog
 Will and Dewitt
 YooHoo & Friends
 Zigby

References

External links 

 TRT Çocuk's Official site 
 TRT's Official Website 
 Watch All TRT Channels live Online
 TRT Çocuk at LyngSat Address

Television stations in Turkey
Turkish-language television stations
Television channels and stations established in 2008
2008 establishments in Turkey
Children's television channels in Turkey
Turkish Radio and Television Corporation